William Blamire (13 April 1790 – 12 January 1862) was a British landowner, civil servant, and Whig politician.

Background and education
Blamire was born at The Oaks, Dalston, England, to a family that originated in Cumberland. He was the eldest son of the naval surgeon William Blamire, and Jane, the third daughter of John Christian and sister of the politician John Christian Curwen. The Cumberland poet Susanna Blamire was his aunt. William was baptised in Dalston by the philosopher William Paley, the vicar there. He was privately tutored at Carlisle, and subsequently, from 1805 to 1808, educated at Westminster School, and, from 1808 to 1811, at Christ Church, Oxford, from which he graduated in 1811.

Career
Blamire was a Cumberland farmer who served as High Sheriff of Cumberland in 1828. He entered the British House of Commons in 1831 as MP for Cumberland, as which he served until the constituency was abolished the following year, after which he stood successfully for the new constituency that replaced it, East Cumberland. Blamire resigned as Member of Parliament in 1836, when, after the passing of the Tithe Commutation Act 1836 he was appointed the first Chief Tithe Commissioner. The Commission reported in 1851 and triggered various new acts and reforms. Blamire retired in 1860.

Family
In 1834, Blamire married his cousin Dorothy. She was the youngest daughter of John Taubman and the widow of Mark Wilks, who had governed Saint Helena during the time of Napoleon's exile there. Blamire's wife died in 1857: he survived her, for five years, until 1862. Several months after his death, a prize in his name was endowed for achievements in agriculture.

Notes

References

Attribution

External links

1790 births
1862 deaths
Alumni of Christ Church, Oxford
High Sheriffs of Cumberland
Members of the Parliament of the United Kingdom for English constituencies
People educated at Westminster School, London
UK MPs 1831–1832
UK MPs 1832–1835
UK MPs 1835–1837